Leonid Mashinsky (born February 6, 1963, Moscow, USSR) is a Russian poet, writer, actor, screenwriter, film director and producer.

Biography 
Leonid studied at a school with a mathematical bias, then graduated from the full-time department of the Moscow State Forest University in 1985. Later he worked in many fields, including record of soundtracks for films. He was a sponsor of the Moscow film festival “Joint” from 2000 to 2003.

Currently, he mainly lives in the village of Belogorye, Voronezh Oblast.

Works 
He was published in the literary magazines Znamya and Neva.

Leonid Mashinsky played in the movies “The Head” and “Mozart” of film director Svetlana Baskova. He directed the movies “The Land of Fly-Agarics” (together with Vladimir Zubkov, the former film producer of the Svetlana Baskova) and “Fence”, in the last of which appeared his daughter, Maria Mashinskaya.

Filmography

References

External links 
 Леонид Машинский

1963 births
Living people
Writers from Moscow
Russian poets
Mass media people from Moscow
Russian film directors
Russian male film actors